James Bullard may refer to:

James B. Bullard, president of the Federal Reserve Bank of St Louis
Jimmy Bullard, English footballer